The Malaysia Civil Defence Force or popularly known as APM or MCDF (formerly JPAM and JPA3) is the civil defence services agency in Malaysia, until 31 August 2016 the Civil Defence Department.

History

Pre-independence
 1939 - Civil Defence activities in Malaysia were initiated by the British Government. Passive Defence Emergency Regulation Enactment under Chapter 4 provided measures to mitigate the effects of Second World War.
 1951 - The Civil Defence Ordinance, 1951 was enacted as a law, establishing civil defence as a national responsibility in the threat faced by the Malayan Emergency
 1952 - Civil Defence Department was established on 24 March for carrying out the provisions of the Ordinance.

Post-independence
 1957 - The Civil Defence Ordinance, 1951 converted into the Civil Defence Act 1951 (Act 221) upon the independence of the state
 1958 - Civil defence became a permanent and important element in national defence system in accordance with the Ninth Schedule Federal Constitution.
 1964 - Civil Defence is extended to Sabah, Sarawak and Singapore following the Malaysia - Indonesia confrontation (Cabinet Paper No. 302/314/64), Singapore detachment would later form the basis of the Singapore Civil Defence Force
 1965 - Membership increased to 36,000 members with 37 branches in addition to new logistics equipment at that time available for nationwide deployment in both peace and war
 1970 - Staffing deployment throughout the country made in accordance with the provisions of the National Service Act 1952 to the floods which swept across the country.
 1972 - Civil Defence Act 1951 was amended to perform the duties and role in peace time to carry out disaster relief services in addition to the wartime duties as defined by the Act
 1993 - The collapse of Highland Tower in Hulu Kelang kickstarts the transformation and modernization of the Civil Defence organisation in Malaysia

Development era
 1994 - Introduction of JPA 3 nickname to distinguish with the Department of Public Service and the Department of Civil Aviation.
 1995 - 991 Emergency Hotline was launched on 20 May as a sign of commitment to the Civil Defence Department to provide 24-hour emergency assistance.
 1996 - Department of Civil Defence Development Plan designed to fully equip all the logistics and infrastructure requirements in the rescue movement.
 2000 - All state capital across the country and six branch offices were now using the 991 hotline system.
 2000 - Physical Project Development Plan projects implemented by seven Central and State Civil Defence is placing 7th District, including two new training centre project.
 2001 - Seven Civil Defence Centre projects at state and district levels approved for implementation in the RMK 8 to all state capitals on the peninsula will have complex administrative, operational and training.
 2004 - Motto 'Selangkah Kehadapan' was introduced as the Civil Defence Department staff's commitment to give its best 'Delivery Service' to the public in accordance with the increase in staffing in the department.
 2006 - Introduced the slogan "Ready, Fast and Integrity" as a catalyst for the Civil Defence Department into a department of excellence.
 2008 - The nickname change from JPA 3 to JPAM was launched by the Director General of Civil Defence himself in March during the Civil Defence Day celebration held in Ipoh.
 2008 - The Malaysian Government introduced the 'One Country One Number' program as the 999-line call centre to consolidate the emergency lines that are used by the Royal Malaysia Police, the Ministry of Health, Fire and Rescue Department and Civil Defence Department Malaysia.
 2015 - Authority for JPAM affairs as a national institution passed from Ministry of Home Affairs to the Prime Minister's Department.
 2016 - JPAM becomes the Malaysia Civil Defence Force and a new wave of modernization programs are approved to be part of the 10th Malaysia Plan.

Organisation 
The National Headquarters encompasses all civil defence and search and rescue units nationwide, and reports to the Prime Minister's Department. As of 2017 Major General (R) Dato' Azmy Bin Yahya serves as its Chief Commissioner of Civil Defence.

The CDF is composed of:
 14 State Commands
 99 District Commands
 55 Civil Defense Units
 and the Education and Training Command, comprising the Civil Defence Academy and the 3 Civil Defence Officer Cadet Schools

Rank insignia 
Source:

The rank system of the MCDF mirrors those used in the Singapore Civil Defence Force, but using the same civil grades as a government agency. In addition, an extra 3 ranks are used above Warrant Officer Class 1 and below Second Lieutenant, a singularity among uniformed forces.

Other ranks
 Private
 Lance Corporal V
 Corporal V/
 Sergeant V//
 Staff Sergeant
 Sergeant Major

Staff Officer
 Junior Staff /
 Senior Staff //
 Higher Staff ///

Officer corps
 Second Lieutenant (CD) ⯁
 Lieutenant (CD) ⯁⯁
 Captain (CD) ⯁⯁
 Major (CD)
 Lieutenant Colonel (CD)
 Colonel (CD)
 Assistant Commissioner (CD) ☆
 Deputy Commissioner (CD) ☆☆
 Commissioner (CD) ☆☆☆
 Chief Commissioner (CD) ☆☆☆☆

Current inventory

Fire engines 
 Isuzu light fire engine
 Nissan Navara 4 by 4
 Handalan 5 ton utility truck

Ambulance 
 Toyota Hiace

Boat
 14' aluminium boat
 17' fiber boat
 Amfibia sealegs
 multi small size boat
 23 Sealegs amphibious boat

References

External links
 
 

Federal ministries, departments and agencies of Malaysia
Prime Minister's Department (Malaysia)
Emergency services in Malaysia
Fire departments
Rescue agencies
1952 establishments in Malaya
Government agencies established in 1952